Abhay Shukla is an Indian actor known for his role as Inspector Nikhil in the TV series C.I.D.

Filmography
 2010 - Knock Out
 2014 - Holiday: A Soldier Is Never Off Duty
 TBA - Deendayal Ek Yugpurush

Television
 2007 - Santaan
 2009 - Shubh Kadam
 2010 - C.I.D. - "Once Upon A Time In Mumbai" as Ishaan (Episode 641)
 2010 - C.I.D. - "Bhutiya Ladki Ka Raaz" as Shopkeeper (Episode 655)
 2011 - C.I.D. - "Abhijeet Ke Ateet Ka Raaz : Part 9" & "Part 10" as Abhay (Episode 691 & Episode 692)
 2011-2016 - C.I.D. as Inspector Nikhil (from Episode 739 to 1348)
 2019 - CIF as Inspector Sushant Sharma
 2019 - Savdhaan India

References

External links

Abhay Shukla on Cinestaan
Abhay Shukla on Bollywood Hungama

Male actors from Mumbai
Year of birth missing (living people)
21st-century Indian male actors
Indian male film actors
Indian male television actors
Living people